Oghara-Iyede is a village  in Isoko North Local Government Area of Delta State, Nigeria. The town has an educational institution called the Atebo Primary School.

Notable people
Sunny Ofehe, environmental rights activist

See also
Oghara

References

Populated places in Delta State